Mbongeni Ngema (born 1 June 1956) is a South African writer, lyricist, composer, director, choreographer and theatre producer, born in Verulam, KwaZulu-Natal (near Durban). He started his career as a theatre backing guitarist. He wrote the multi-award-winning musical Sarafina! and co-wrote the multi-award-winning Woza Albert! He is known for plays that reflect the spirit of black South Africans under apartheid.

He was previously married to actress Leleti Khumalo, who received a 1988 Tony Award nomination for Best Actress in a Musical for Sarafina! (and who also starred in its 1992 film adaptation), as well as starring in the leading role in South Africa's first Oscar-nominated film Yesterday.

Early life

Born in Verulam and raised in the heart of Zululand, Mbongeni Ngema has distinguished himself as a renowned playwright, screenwriter and librettist. Ngema prides himself on being from the lineage of the warriors Mbandama and Sigcwelegcwele kaMhlekehleke of the Ngema clan who led the Ingoba Makhosi regiment, a pivotal regiment that defeated the British armies at the Battle of Isandlwana in the Anglo-Zulu war, on 22 January 1879.

Career

He is best known as the Writer of the internationally acclaimed and award-winning musical Sarafina!, which was nominated for five Tony Awards, and later nominated for the prestigious Grammy Awards. The musical won 11 NAACP Image Awards enjoyed a two-year run on Broadway, toured the US, Europe, Australia and Japan and was later adapted into a feature film  starring Whoopi Goldberg, Leleti Khumalo and Miriam Makeba.

Ngema has had a string of blockbusters that include his award-winning and internationally revered Woza Albert, Township Fever (1990), which travelled from the Market Theatre to the USA the Brooklyn Academy of Music's Majestic Theatre; Mama (1995), Asinamali (1996), Maria Maria (1997), The Zulu – the musical (1999), 1906 Bhambada The Freedom Fighter, The House of Shaka (2005) and The Lion of the East (2006).

In 1995, Ngema created Sarafina II, a musical addressing the AIDS epidemic in South Africa, which debuted in early 1996.

In 1997, Ngema was appointed as a visiting lecturer at the University of Zululand to teach his unique artistic technique and subsequently produced the first CD released by the university's music department.

In 1998, Ngema was inducted in the New York "Walk of Fame" in front of the Lucille Lortel Theatre in Manhattan, New York City, as one of the revered Writers of the 21st century. In 2001 during the African Renaissance festival, his name was engraved on the entrance of the City Hall in Durban alongside those of Nelson Mandela, Oliver Tambo, Miriam Makeba and other heroes of the liberation struggle.

As a librettist, Ngema has written the musical soundtrack for Sarafina - the movie (1992) and produced the movie's soundtrack alongside Quincy Jones. He has composed several music albums, including the famous and locally loved album Stimela SaseZola. Ngema has written and arranged numerous songs as well as arranged music for artists such as Michael Bolton. He was also one of the vocal arrangers for The Lion King, Disney's animated film. For this, Ngema received a multi-platinum award for sales in excess of 6 million copies. He subsequently won a Grammy Award for the movie adaptation. "Woza My Fohloza", the new millennium song, and several albums of his musicals are on Ngema's librettist list.

In 2003, he was appointed as artistic director for the 2003 Cricket World Cup and in 2004 appointed as one of the organisers of the tenth anniversary celebrations of South Africa's democracy. He has been entrusted by the KZN Department of Arts, Sports and Recreation for establishing and managing the recording studio and record company, The KZN Music House managed by his company Committed Artists.

Several books and academic work have been written about Mbongeni Ngema and his celebrated works, including Nothing Except Ourselves by Laura Jones (USA), The Best of Mbongeni Ngema, The man and his music by Isabel Cooke (RSA), An investigation into the creation and interpretation in Mbongeni Ngema’s intra-cultural Theatre – N. O. Sabelo (UKZN Thesis).

Ngema has tapped into his own richly-nurtured background of traditional story-telling, learned as a small child from his great-grandmother, to create his spell-binding one-man show, which melds memories of his childhood, spent in the heart of Zululand, with the wealth of his heritage, bringing vividly to life the historic panoply of the Zulu nation. The Zulu continues its triumphant tours of South Africa, filling theatres around the country, and is set to soon tour abroad.

Featuring
Mbongeni Ngema has participated in a song called "Take This Song", recorded with the reggae band Third World.

Mbongeni Ngema released Freedom is Coming Tomorrow (Remix) with Emtee, Saudi, Gigi Lamayne, Tamarsha, Reason, Blaklez & DJ Machaba Third World.

Controversies 
In 1996, the planned 12-month run of Sarafina II was canceled due to corruption allegations, which implicated Ngema as well as the Minister of Health Nkosazana Dlamini-Zuma. Ngema was subsequently investigated for fraud.

Ngema composed a song called " Amandiya" which was critical of how the Indian people of KwaZulu Natal were treating its employees and paying them a pittance. This song was banned by the high court in South Africa and later an age restriction of 18 was allowed for the song to be in circulation again.

In July 2019, Ngema was removed from his position as co-director of a production of Sarafina following allegations of sexual harassment and intimidation by a cast member.

In 2020, his ex-wife Xoliswa Nduneni-Ngema published memoirs in which she detailed instances of alleged abuse and rape committed by Ngema.

Productions
 Asinamali (1987)
 Sarafina! (1988)
 Magic at 4 AM (1993)
 Circle of Life (African voices) (1995)
 Mama (1996)
 Sarafina! 2 (1997)
 Nikeziwe (2005)
 The House of Shaka (2006)
 Lion of the East (2009)
 Take This Song in collaboration with the Reggae Band Third World
 The Zulu (2013)

Honors and awards
 1987 Tony Award - Asinamali! nominated for Best Direction of a Play 
 1988 Tony Award - Sarafina! received five nominations: Best Choreography, Best Direction of a Musical, Best Original Score, Best Actress in a Musical 
 1988 - Grammy Award - Sarafina! nominated for a Grammy Award at 32nd Annual Grammy Awards 
 1988 - NAACP Image Awards - Sarafina! the musical won 11 NAACP Image Awards in several categories
 Grammy Award - The Lion King, Disney Animated Film, for vocal arrangements
 1998 - inducted in the New York "Walk of Fame" in front of the Lucille Lortel Theatre in Manhattan, New York City
 2001 - Ngema's name engraved on City Hall Entrance in Durban alongside Nelson Mandela, Oliver Tambo and Miriam Makeba
 2004 - he was voted 92nd in the Top 100 Great South Africans.
 2008 - Living Legend Award from the eThekwini Municipality, Durban, Kwa-Zulu Natal
 2013 - Lifetime Achievement Award at Simon Mabhunu Sabela Film and Television Awards
 2013 - Inaugural Recognition Award at SAMRO's Wawela Awards
 2013 - Awarded honorary doctorate by the University of Zululand
 2014 - Awarded Lifetime Achievement Award at the Naledi Theatre Awards ceremony.
 2018 - SAMA Lifetime Achievement Award

References

External links

Mbongeni Ngema  at Britannica
Mbongeni Ngema at Mail & Guardian
Mbongeni Ngema at ESAT				

1955 births
Living people
South African dramatists and playwrights
South African musicians
South African film score composers
Male film score composers
People from eThekwini Metropolitan Municipality